Khasakkinte Itihasam ( or , generally referred to as Khasak in Malayalam literary circles) is the Malayalam debut novel by Indian writer O. V. Vijayan (1930–2005). It was first serialised in 1968 and published as a single edition in 1969. The novel has been translated from Malayalam into French by Dominique Vitalyos.

The novel tells the story of a young university student, who leaves a promising future to take up a primary school teacher’s job in the remote village of Khasak. Little by little, the village reveals its secrets. The protagonist is soon bewitched by this ancient village where dreams and legends intermingle. He immerses himself in the "bewitching sensuousness" of the new "rustic, amoral world", only to emerge as an "involved outsider". He finds rational inquiry meaningless and begins a metaphorical journey inwards. The novel is often associated with the general disillusionment with the communist movement in Kerala in the 1960s. 

The novel is characterized by the matter-of-fact inclusion of mythical elements into seemingly realistic fiction (magic realism). The novel, published in 1969, after more than a decade of drafting and re-drafting, became an instant hit with young people in Kerala. The multi-faceted work is still one of the bestsellers in Malayalam. It has had over 50 reprints, making it one of the most widely read Malayalam novels.   

The novel was "translated" into English by Vijayan in 1994 (under the title The Legends of Khasak, Penguin Books), but this version differs substantially from the Malayalam original. Most Kerala readers prefer to read this as an independent novel rather than seeing it as a translation. The English version has also been translated into German by Ursula Gräfe.

Background
Khasakkinte Itihasam was inspired by the Ottupulackal family's stay at a village called Thasarak near Palakkad (in central Kerala) for a year. O. V. Vijayan's sister was appointed as the teacher of a single-teacher government school in the village (1956). Some of the characters in the novel were modeled after real-life characters whom Vijayan encountered in Thasarak.

In an afterword to the English version of the novel Vijayan wrote:
 

The njattupura where protagonist Ravi ran the school was modeled on a real-life njattupura. This njattupura was a 'temporary shelter' for O. V. Vijayan during the late 1950s and 1960s. Arabikkulam, a pond that finds mention in the novel, is also located in Thasarak. An O. V. Vijayan memorial is present at Thasrak in Palakkad.

Vijayan took twelve years (begun in 1956) to complete Khasakkinte Itihasam. The character Appukkili was originally created by Vijayan for his short story "Appukkili" - a chapter in the finished book - which was published in October 1958 (Mathrubhumi Weekly).

Synopsis 

The protagonist, Ravi, a Malayali final year under-graduate student in Madras, is haunted by the guilt of an affair he had with his stepmother. He thus abandons the prospects of a bright academic career, deserts his girlfriend Padma and leaves on a long journey, which finally brings him to the remote (fictional) village of Khasak near Palakkad (central Kerala). At Khasak, he works in a single-teacher government primary school as part of the Malabar District Board’s education initiative.    

The story commences with Ravi’s arrival at Khasak and the beginning of his encounters with its people and legends. He immerses himself in the 'bewitching sensuousness of the rustic, amoral world', only to emerge as an 'involved outsider'. He finds rational inquiry meaningless and begins a metaphorical journey inwards. The narrative strategy of the novel is characterized by the matter-of-fact inclusion of fantastic or mythical elements into seemingly realistic fiction. The narration also makes sense of multiple separate realities (see magic realism).    

At the end of a series of events, including the threat of suspension from the authorities, Ravi keeps his word to his ex-girlfriend Padma to leave Khasak. The novel ends with Ravi in the monsoon rain, waiting for his bus to leave the village, watching a snake that had struck him withdrawing into its hole.

Magic realism

Characters 
 Ravi - the new school teacher in Khasak (Palakkad), originally from Pattambi.
 Ravi's father - a doctor in a coffee plantation in Ooty.
 Padma - Ravi's ex-girlfriend from Madras Christian College, Madras
 Suma and Rama - half-sisters of Ravi
 Bodhananda Swami - a holy man managing an ashrama
 Kelu Menon - the post-man to Khasak

Khasak 

 Madhavan Nair -  a tailor by profession, Ravi's mate in the village.
 Allappicha Mollakka - the village primary madrasa teacher and the mosque mukri
 Nizam Ali "Khaliyar" -  the young mystic/healer (khaliyar) in the village, lives in an abandoned mosque (the King's Mosque)
 Maimuna - daughter of Allappicha Mollakka, married to Chukra Rawthar.
 Thevarathu Shivaraman Nair - a landlord in Khasak
 Kuppu Achan - the toddy-tapper/pub owner in Khasak
 Kuttadan Pushari -  the priest/oracle of goddess Nallamma
 Aliyar - the village restaurant owner
 Syed Miyan Sheik Thangal - the founder of the Rawthar community in Khasak.
 Pulinkompile Pothi - a spirit, village goddess living on a tree
 Nallamma - the goddess of smallpox
 Thithibi Umma - Allappicha Mollakka's first wife
 Chukra Rawthar "Mungankozhi" - husband of Maimuna
 Malikakkal Attar - owner of a cigarette factory in Kumankavu
 Zohrabi - Malikakkal Attar's wife
 Narayani Amma - Sivaraman Nair's wife
 Kelan Master - manages a primary school in Kumankavu
 Gopalu Panikkar -  the traditional village teacher, later a healer
 Lakshmi – wife of Gopalu Panikkar 

 Ramachar – cattle broker, the apprentice of Gopalu Panicker
 Abida - daughter of Chukra Rawthar from his first marriage
 Neeli - mother of Appukkili
 Nachi, Kochi and Kali - sisters of Neeli
 Kuttappu Nari - husband of Kali
 Chanthumma - daughter of the wandering mystic Thangal Pakkiri, a widow
 Kunhu-Noor and Chanthumuthu  - Chanthumma's children
 Kalyani - wife of Kuppu Achan
 Kesi – daughter-in-law of Kuppu Achan
 Mayandi - the village bootlegger/pub owner
 Cholayumma – mother of Kunha-Amina
 Ossan Annan – the Muslim barber (the ossan)

One-Teacher School students   

 Kunn-Amina
 Karuvu
 Unipparadi
 Kochu-Zohara
 Kholusu
 Alam Khan
 Vavar
 Nurjihan
 Unipparathi
 Kinnari

Publication history

 The novel was serialised in Mathrubhumi Weekly in 28 parts, between 28 January 1968 and 4 August 1968.
 It was published in a single edition (Malayalam) by Current Books in 1969.
 The first DC Books edition (Malayalam) was published in 1990.
 The English version was published in 1994 (Penguin Books).
The novel (Malayalam) has been reprinted more than fifty times.

Reception 

O.V. Vijayan rose to prominence in Kerala with his first novel Khasakkinte Itihasam. The novel became an instant hit with the young Kerala people. Such was the influence of the novel on the people of Kerala that the whole of modern Malayalam fiction came to be defined in terms of a ‘before’ and an ‘after’ in relation to it. 

At the time of publishing, the novel 'infuriated' some of the Kerala conservatives and the progressives alike (for different reasons). It was criticised by both for its depiction of 'sexual anarchy'. Orthodox readers charged it with 'obscurity', 'partly because of its new idiom and partly its play with space and time' (which contrasted with the familiar, chronological narration).

English version

O. V. Vijayan published his English version of Khasakkinte Itihasam in 1994 (under the title 'The Legends of Khasak'). The English version has had a pan-Indian appeal.  This version differs substantially from the Malayalam original in its sensibility. Most readers prefer to read this as an independent novel by Vijayan rather than seeing it as a translation. Authors like N. S. Madhavan have been openly critical of the 'freedoms Vijayan took with his own work' as well as his English style.

The English version was published long after Vijayan experienced an 'epistemological break' after meeting the monk Swami Karunakara Guru. The early O. V. Vijayan was marked by 'deep philosophical doubt and skepticism', but the later O. V. Vijayan 'upheld certitudes'. The Legends of Khasak was written by 'the Vijayan of certitudes', which makes it a very different novel in its sensibility, in spite of being a 'translation'. 

One critic makes the following comparison between Khasakkinte Itihasam and The Legends of Khasak to prove this point. A literal translation of an important passage in Khasakkinte Itihasam reads:

"What is his truth?" They asked one another.They recalled the curse that the mollakka had sought to cast on Nizam Ali. It had no effect on him."The khazi's truth," they said, "is the sheikh's truth.""What then of the mollakka's? Is he untrue?" They asked again."He too is the truth.""How can that be so?""Because truths are many."

In The Legends of Khasak, O. V. Vijayan rendered this passage thus:

"What is the Khazi's truth?" The troubled elders asked one another.They recalled the spell the mullah had tried to cast on Nizam Ali. They had seen the spell fail."The Khazi's truth," they told themselves, "is the Sheikh's truth.""If that be so," the troubled minds were in search of certitude, "is Mollakka the untruth?""He is the truth too.""How is it so?""Many truths make the big truth."

References

External links

Publishers 
 DC Books (Malayalam)
 DC Books (Malayalam) (Paper Back)
 Penguin India (The Legends Of Khasak) 
 Fayard (Les légendes de Khasak)

Analysis 
 India Today (Tarun J. Tejpal)
 The Hindu (E. V. Ramakrishnan)
 Business Standard (Nilanjana S. Roy)
 The Pioneer (V. R. Jayaraj)
 Malayala Manoama (Baiju Govind)
 Mathrubhumi (Mammootty (actor) with K Unnikrishnan)
 The Indian Express (Amrith Lal)
 Mint (Prathap Nair)
 BusinessLine (Deepa Bhasthi)

Malayalam novels
1969 novels
Novels set in Kerala
Culture of Palakkad district
Novels by O. V. Vijayan
1969 Indian novels
1968 Indian novels
1968 novels
Magic realism novels